Aristaces or Aristakes I was the second Catholicos of the Armenian Church from 325 until his death in 333. He was the younger son and successor of Gregory the Illuminator, the founder and first head of the Armenian Church.

Most of the information about Aristaces's life comes from the fifth-century Armenian history attributed to Agathangelos. Aristaces was born in Caesarea of Cappadocia to Gregory the Illuminator and his wife (called Julitta in one version of Agathangelos and Mariam by Movses Khorenatsi). He is said to have entered a monastery with his mother as a child after his father left for Armenia. When Aristaces grew up, he went under the tutelage of a monk called Nicomachus, who sent him to live as an ascetic in the desert. Around 325, when Gregory wished to give up the Catholicosate in favor of a life as a hermit, King Tiridates III of Armenia sent for Aristaces and his brother Vrtanes and had them brought to Armenia to take over leadership of the Church.

In 325, Aristaces was sent as the Armenian representative to the First Council of Nicaea and brought back the Nicene canons; his signature appears among those of the bishops who participated in the council. Aristaces is also said to have participated in an embassy together with Gregory and King Tiridates to the newly converted Roman emperor Constantine the Great, although this is considered "purely legendary" by scholar Robert W. Thomson.

Agathangelos writes nothing about Aristaces's death. Faustus of Byzantium writes that Aristaces died "a confessor's death" but gives no further details, while Movses Khorenatsi claims that he was murdered in Sophene by a governor named Archilaeus in retaliation for being reprimanded by the Catholicos.

See also
 Gregorids

References

Sources
 
 
 

330s deaths
Armenian saints
Catholicoi of Armenia
Year of birth unknown
Saints of the Armenian Apostolic Church